

Current dioceses 
All Roman Rite

Ecclesiastical province of Alger
 Metropolitan Roman Catholic Archdiocese of Alger; united with the titular see of Iulia Caesarea (Ancient bishopric at Alger)
 suffragan Roman Catholic Diocese of Constantine; united with the titular see of Hippo (Regius) (Ancient bishopric at Constantine)
 suffragan Roman Catholic Diocese of Oran

Exempt 
(Immediately subject to the Holy See)
 Roman Catholic Diocese of Laghouat

Source and External links 
 Official Website of the Catholic Church in Algeria
 GCatholic

See also 
 Catholicism in Algeria

Dioceses
Catholic dioceses
Algeria